Pardue is a surname. Notable people with the surname include:

Austin Pardue (1899–1981), American cleric
Homer C. Pardue (1910–1979), American thoroughbred trainer and owner
Jimmy Pardue (1930–1964), American race car driver
Kip Pardue (born 1975), American model and actor
Mary-Lou Pardue, American geneticist
Deva Pardue, Irish American graphic designer and activist